Susan Lynn Weber (born April 1, 1986) is an American soccer defender who previously played for Philadelphia Independence of Women's Professional Soccer.

Education

She attended Islip High School on Long Island. She got her bachelor's degree in physical education at Hofstra University in 2008.

Sporting career
She was named the CAA Female Scholar-Athlete of the Year in 2007. She was also named First-Team Academic All-American. In 2008, she was the first soccer All-American at Hofstra and women's league Defender of the Year.

References

External links
 WPS player profile
 Long Island Fury player profile

1986 births
Living people
Hofstra Pride women's soccer players
Georgia Bulldogs women's soccer players
Women's association football defenders
Boston Breakers players
American women's soccer players
Women's Professional Soccer players
Long Island Rough Riders (USL W League) players
USL W-League (1995–2015) players